Martyn See is a Singaporean filmmaker and the former Executive Secretary of the now defunct Singaporeans for Democracy.

Life and career
Martyn See has been a feature editor for local Singapore films, some of which include Mee Pok Man (1994, Eric Khoo), That One No Enough (2000, Jack Neo), I Do I Do (2005, Wen Hui, Jack Neo), Singapore Gaga (2005,Tan Pin Pin), Just Follow Law (2007, Jack Neo) and Money No Enough 2 (2008, Jack Neo). In 2004, Martyn made the 26-minute documentary film Singapore Rebel, about Dr. Chee Soon Juan, the leader of the opposition Singapore Democratic Party (SDP).

In March 2005, government movie censors ordered the withdrawal of his film from the Singapore International Film Festival. See was put under police investigation by the Singapore government, and threatened with prosecution under the Films Act, requiring him to surrender his video camera, taped footage of the documentary and materials related to the production. See could face up to two years in jail or a fine of up to S$100,000.

In 2006, Martyn See made a new 49 minute documentary entitled Zahari's 17 Years, on Singapore's late ex-political prisoner Said Zahari, who spent a total of 17 years in detention without trial as a  result of Operation Coldstore. The film has been banned by the Singapore Government.

On 14 July 2010, the Ministry of Information, Communications and the Arts banned his latest film, Dr Lim Hock Siew, about Dr Lim Hock Siew's similar plight.

See also 
 Operation Coldstore
 Lim Hock Siew

References

External links 
 Martyn See's blog
 Amnesty International description of Singapore Rebel issue
 Speech Acts – Censorship and Documentary Filmmaking in Singapore

Singaporean film directors
Singaporean people of Chinese descent
Living people
Year of birth missing (living people)